Britain's Worst Driver was a British television series created and hosted by ex-Top Gear host Quentin Willson made by Mentorn and shown on Five in the United Kingdom from 2002 to 2003. In 30-minute episodes, the worst drivers chosen by viewers "earned back" their driving licences by performing various driving challenges. The driver who performed the worst was awarded Britain's Worst Driver. The success of the series led to localized versions of the show, and creation of the Worst Driver television franchise. Comedian Tim Key, nicknamed Timid Tim won the first series and received a car but sold after a week.

References

External links

2000s British reality television series
2002 British television series debuts
2003 British television series endings
Automotive television series
Driver's education
British game shows
Channel 5 (British TV channel) reality television shows
Driving in the United Kingdom
Worst Driver (franchise)